Operation Ardennes was part of the Iraq War.

History
Iraqi Security Forces and soldiers from the 4th Brigade, 425th Combat Team (Airborne) 25th Division conducted a joint raid in Muwayllihah, Iraq, to deny insurgents refuge and prevent them from emplacing improvised explosive devices 14 June.

Company C, 3rd Battalion, 509th Parachute Infantry Regiment, 4th Brigade Combat Team (Airborne), 25th Infantry Division and ISF detained two suspected insurgents during the operation dubbed Joint Operation Ardennes.

"Operation Ardennes was an excellent starting point for future joint operations with 2nd Brigade, 8th Iraqi Army Security Forces," said Staff Sgt. Clifton Talley, the fire support noncommissioned officer for C Company, from Cookeville, Tenn.  "Working with this platoon was a great experience for Coalition Forces and Iraqi Security Forces alike."

Operation Ardennes yielded two suspected insurgents wanted for their potential involvement in targeting Iraqi and Coalition Forces with improvised explosive devices and for their involvement in sectarian violence.

Military Units Involved
US forces reported to be involved were
Company C, 3rd Battalion, 509th Parachute Infantry Regiment, 4th Brigade Combat Team (Airborne), 25th Infantry Division

Iraqi Forces reported to be involved
Iraqi Security Forces

Casualties
No US deaths were reported during the operation, however four US soldiers were wounded during the operation.

References

 Press release ID 07-01-03P Dated 17 June 2007
 National Force Iraq

Military operations of the Iraq War in 2007
Military operations of the Iraq War involving the United States
Military operations of the Iraq War involving Iraq
Iraqi insurgency (2003–2011)